The mayor of Austin is the official head of the city of Austin in the U.S. state of Texas. The office was established in 1840 after Austin incorporated as a city in 1839. The mayor of Austin is elected to a four-year term and limited to serving no more than two terms.

Kirk Watson took office as mayor on January 6, 2023, for a second term, having served as mayor from 1997 to 2001.

Duties and powers
Austin has a council–manager form of government which means day-to-day operations of the city are run by the city manager. The mayor is the head of city government ceremonially. The mayor is technically a member of the city council and is required to preside at all meetings. The mayor is also allowed to vote on all matters that come before the city council, but has no veto powers.

As of fiscal year 2022-2023, the salary for the mayor is set at $134,191.

Election
The mayor is elected in a citywide election. Currently, elections occur every four years during even-numbered years. Elections are non-partisan and by majority, but if no candidate receives a majority a run-off election is called between the top two candidates who received the most votes.

Succession
Per city code of ordinances, if the mayor is absent or disabled, the Mayor Pro Tem is to act as mayor until the mayor returns or an election is held to fill the vacancy.

The mayor is subject to recall by registered voters if a petition is signed and filed that contains the signatures of 10 percent of the qualified voters. If the petition is verified, a recall election is called at the earliest convenient available date. If the recall passes, the mayor immediately vacates office. There are two limitations to the recall process. First, no recall petition can be filed until the mayor has been in office for at least six months. Second, the mayor will not be subject to more than one recall.

List

References